The Kazakhstan motorcycle Grand Prix is a Motorcycle Grand Prix event that will start in 2023. The race will be hosted at the Sokol International Racetrack near Almaty on 9 July 2023.

References

Kazakhstan
Motorcycle
Kazakhstan
2023 establishments in Kazakhstan
Kazakhstan